William Bathurst Dove (17 April 1872 – 14 August 1944) was an English golfer. He competed in the men's individual event at the 1900 Summer Olympics.

References

External links
 

British male golfers
Amateur golfers
Olympic golfers of Great Britain
Golfers at the 1900 Summer Olympics
Golfers from London
People from Pinner
1872 births
1944 deaths